Tute Ruoshi Zhujiu succeeded his father Jucheer as chanyu of the Xiongnu in 172 AD. In 177 AD, Tute and a contingent of horsemen  took part in an expedition against the Xianbei. They were heavily defeated and only a quarter of their forces returned alive. Tute died in 178 AD and was succeeded by his son Huzheng.

Footnotes

References

Bichurin N.Ya., "Collection of information on peoples in Central Asia in ancient times", vol. 1, Sankt Petersburg, 1851, reprint Moscow-Leningrad, 1950

Taskin B.S., "Materials on Sünnu history", Science, Moscow, 1968, p. 31 (In Russian)

Chanyus